The 2014 ICC World Cricket League Division Five was a cricket tournament that took place from 6–13 March 2014. It formed part of the ICC World Cricket League and qualification for the 2019 Cricket World Cup.

Teams

The teams that took part in the tournament were decided according to the results of the 2013 ICC World Cricket League Division Six, the 2012 ICC World Cricket League Division Four and the 2012 ICC World Cricket League Division Five.

Squads

Fixtures

Round robin

Points table

Matches

Playoffs

5th place playoff

3rd place playoff

Final

Statistics

Most runs
The top five highest run scorers (total runs) are included in this table.

Most wickets
The following table contains the five leading wicket-takers.

Final Placings

After the conclusion of the tournament the teams were distributed as follows:

References

http://www.espncricinfo.com/wcldiv5-2014/content/series/722647.html

2014, 5
2014 in cricket
Cricket in Malaysia
2014 in Malaysian sport